Irfan Abdul Ghani (born 17 June 1989 in Johor) is a Malaysian footballer who plays as a defender.

External links
 

1989 births
Living people
Malaysian footballers
People from Johor
Perak F.C. players
Association football defenders